Mofakham's House of Mirrors (in Persian: آئینه‌خانه مفخم Ayene khane Mofakham), is in Bojnord, in the province of North Khorasan, Iran. Dating from the Qajar period, it was constructed under the reign of Nasseredin Shah by the mayor at the time, known as Mofakham.

Museum 
In 1991, Iran's Cultural Heritage Organization took over the mansion which turned it into the Museum of Anthropology and Archeology.

Gallery

References 

Palaces in Iran
Qajar dynasty